Kolobovka is a rural locality (a selo) and the administrative center of Kolobovskoye Rural Settlement, Leninsky District, Volgograd Oblast, Russia. The population was 862 as of 2010. There are 23 streets.

Geography 
Kolobovka is located on the left bank of the Akhtuba River, between Solodovka and Stasov, 23 km southeast of Leninsk (the district's administrative centre) by road. Solodovka is the nearest rural locality.

References 

Rural localities in Leninsky District, Volgograd Oblast